Pelaw is a residential area in Gateshead, located around  from Newcastle upon Tyne,  from Sunderland, and  from Durham. In 2011, Census data for the Gateshead Metropolitan Borough Council ward of Heworth and Pelaw recorded a total population of 9,100.

Pelaw lies in between the older settlements of Heworth to the west, Bill Quay to the east, and Wardley to the south, with the southern bank of the River Tyne forming the northern border.

History

Pelaw came into being due to the huge Victorian factory complexes of the Co-operative Wholesale Society (CWS) which was the manufacturing division of the then burgeoning Co-op company, which grew up along the length of the Shields Road. This mile long stretch of red-brick industry was home to factories making clothing and textiles, furniture, pharmaceuticals, household cleaning products, quilts, books and magazines and the world-famous 'Pelaw' shoe polish.

The factories created Pelaw, and were a significant employer in the area during most of the twentieth century. Due to inevitable foreign competition, the prevailing economic climate, and government policies of the times, the majority of the factories were closed and demolished between the mid-1970s and early 1990s, to be replaced in recent years by modern housing estates.

Only one of the original CWS buildings – the Cabinet Factory – is extant. The Cabinet Factory in Bill Quay, which later became a major Brentford Nylons plant, has been redeveloped, now housing Stonehills Business Park. The last factory to be demolished was the Shirt Factory, the site having since been redeveloped in to a supermarket.

Demography 
According to the 2011 Census, the Pelaw and Heworth ward has a population of 9,100. The ward is split into three distinct districts:

Bill Quay (population of 1,525) – Located to the east of King George's Field, and to the north of the A185 road.
Heworth (population of 5,273) – Located to the south of the Tyne and Wear Metro line.
Pelaw (population of 2,302) – Located to the north of the Tyne and Wear Metro line, and the A185 road.

52.2% of the population are female, slightly above the national average, while 47.8% are male. Only 2.7% of the population were from a black, Asian and minority ethnic (BAME) group, as opposed to 14.6% of the national population.

Data from the 2011 Census found that the average life expectancy in Pelaw and Heworth is 79.1 years for men, and 81.1 years for women. These statistics compare fairly favourably, when compared to the average life expectancy in the North East of England, of 77.4 and 81.4 years, respectively.

Car ownership is lower than the average in the Metropolitan Borough of Gateshead (63.5%), but lower than the national average of 74.2% – with 61.1% of households in the Pelaw and Heworth ward owning at least one car.

In Pelaw, there is a significant contrast between ethnic groups. For example, the five output areas that covering the centre of Pelaw are around 90% White British, with the most ethnically diverse output area being 88.1%. The four output areas on the eastern and western edges of the district are all at least 97% White British, with the least ethnically diverse output area being 99.2%. Pelaw is more ethnically diverse than other districts within Gateshead, such as Leam Lane and Windy Nook, but less so, when compared with Felling and Saltwell.

Education 
Pelaw is served by one primary school, St. Alban's Catholic Primary School. In June 2017, the school was rated "good" by Ofsted. Nearby primary schools include Bill Quay Primary School in Bill Quay, The Drive Community Primary School in Heworth, and Wardley Primary School and White Mere Community Primary School in Wardley.

In terms of secondary education, Pelaw is located within the catchment area for Heworth Grange School in Leam Lane. An inspection carried out by Ofsted in January 2017 deemed the school to be "inadequate". St. Alban's Catholic Primary School also acts as a feeder school for Cardinal Hume Catholic School in Wrekenton, rated "outstanding" by Ofsted in January 2014, as well as St. Joseph's Catholic Academy in Hebburn, which was rated "requires improvement" by Ofsted in January 2019.

Governance 
Pelaw and Heworth is a local council ward in the Metropolitan Borough of Gateshead. As of April 2020, the ward is served by three councillors: Ian Patterson, John Paul Dilston and Rosy Oxberry. Pelaw is located within the parliamentary constituency of Jarrow. As of April 2020, the constituency is served by Kate Osborne.

Transport

Air 
The nearest airport to Pelaw is Newcastle International Airport, which is located around  away by road. Teesside International Airport and Carlisle Lake District Airport are located around  away by road.

Bus 
Pelaw is served by Go North East's frequent Crusader 27 service, which runs up to every 10 minutes from Newcastle, Gateshead and Heworth to Hebburn, Jarrow and South Shields.

It is also served by Gateshead Central Taxi services 515 which runs hourly between Heworth and Hebburn and 568, which is hourly between Heworth and Bill Quay.

Rail

The nearest Tyne and Wear Metro stations is located at Pelaw. The Tyne and Wear Metro provides a regular service to Newcastle, with trains running up to every 6 minutes (7–8 minutes during the evening and Sunday) between Pelaw and South Gosforth, increasing to up to every 3 minutes at peak times. Heworth is the nearest rail station, with Northern Trains providing an hourly service along the Durham Coast Line.

Pelaw is the site of a rail junction located on the original route of the East Coast Main Line. Pelaw Junction was the former meeting point of the Brandling Junction Railway, Leamside Line and Durham Coast Line. Trains continue to serve the Durham Coast Line today, including the Tyne and Wear Metro between Pelaw Junction and Sunderland, an hourly passenger service operated by Northern Trains, and freight services. The Leamside Line closed to passengers in 1964, under the Beeching Axe, and to freight in the 1990s.

Road 
Pelaw is served by the A185 – a route linking the area with Heworth, Hebburn and Jarrow. By road, Gateshead can be reached in around 10 minutes, Newcastle in 15 minutes, and Newcastle International Airport in 30 minutes.

People from Pelaw
 Bobby Hughes – Footballer who played in the Football League for Wigan Borough and Brentford.
Chris Waddle – England international footballer, who won three Division 1 titles with Olympique de Marseille.
John Thain – Footballer who played in the Football League for Brentford, Grimsby Town and Newcastle United.
 Ronnie Starling – England international footballer, and captain of 1935 FA Cup winners, Sheffield Wednesday.
 The juvenile jazz band, The Pelaw Hussars, appeared in the film Get Carter.

See also
 Co-operative Wholesale Society
 South Pelaw

References

Geography of Tyne and Wear
Gateshead